Kanagulk is a locality in western Victoria, Australia.

Lake Kanagulk is a designated wildlife reserve under the management of Parks Victoria.

A Bureau of Meteorology weather station has been placed in Kanagulk.

There have been concerns about contamination from mining refuse dumping at Kanagulk. Iluka Resources used Kanagulk to store by-products from its Hamilton processing plant. There has been opposition from local community groups over fears of radon gas levels and water contamination. The application to continue dumping at Kanagulk was rejected by Horsham Council in 2016 after Kanagulk Lancare Group found concerning levels of radon gas at the site.

References

External links

Towns in Victoria (Australia)
Rural City of Horsham